
Red One and variants may refer to:

People 
Red1, band member of Rascalz
RedOne (born 1972), Moroccan-Swedish international record producer

Works 
"The Red One", a short story by Jack London
The Red One (album), a 1997 album by Little Willie Littlefield
Remedy (The Red One), a 2001 album by the Christian rock band Remedy Drive
Red One (comics) - 2015 comics, issued by Image Comics, story by Xavier Dorison, art and cover by Rachel Dodson, Terry Dodson.
Red One (film), a 2023 Christmas film starring Dwayne Johnson

Other 
Red One (camera), released in 2007 by Red Digital Cinema Camera Company
Red One, a character of Choudenshi Bioman in the Super Sentai series
Red one calls to UK ambulance services
"The Red One", a fictional spacecraft in Lilo & Stitch and its franchise

See also
"The Big Red One", nickname for the 1st Infantry Division (United States)
The Big Red One